Lineodes multisignalis is a moth in the family Crambidae. It was described by Gottlieb August Wilhelm Herrich-Schäffer in 1868. It is found in Cuba.

References

Moths described in 1868
Spilomelinae
Endemic fauna of Cuba